Indolestes tenuissimus is a species of damselfly in the family Lestidae,
commonly known as the slender reedling. It is found in north-eastern Australia, New Guinea and on Aru.

Its natural habitats are freshwater swamps, ponds and pools. The adult is a medium-sized damselfly (wingspan 50mm, length 45mm) with the thorax being mainly pale blue with darker patches.  The abdomen is mid to dark grey on dorsal surfaces, lighter below, with segment ten forming a distinct pale band. The male superior anal appendages are sinuate. In Australia, the distribution is in suitable habitat in the north-eastern part of the continent from the tip of Cape York Peninsula to central Queensland. The taxon has been assessed in the IUCN Red List as being of least concern, and it appears in the Catalogue of Life.

Gallery

References

External links

 Catalogue of Life - Indolestes tenuissimus

Lestidae
Odonata of Australia
Insects of Australia
Insects of New Guinea
Insects of Indonesia
Taxa named by Robert John Tillyard
Insects described in 1906
Damselflies